Euxine was a town of ancient Caria.

Its site is located near Kepez, Ortaca, Asiatic Turkey.

References

Populated places in ancient Caria
Former populated places in Turkey